David Fitzgerald (born 1996) is an Irish hurler who plays as a midfielder for club side Inagh-Kilnamona and at inter-county level with the Clare senior hurling team.

Career statistics

Inter-county

Honours

University of Limerick
Fitzgibbon Cup (1): 2018

Clare
National Hurling League (1): 2016

Awards
The Sunday Game Team of the Year (1): 2022
All-Star Award (1): 2022

References

1996 births
Living people
Inagh-Kilnamona hurlers
Clare inter-county hurlers